For the Perumpadapu Swaroopam, see Kingdom of Cochin

Perumpadappu is a small area of Palluruthy region of Cochin city of Ernakulam district, Kerala. It is stretch around 4 km2 and holds three Hindu temples and two main churches and a mosque to its credit.

 The bus stops in this area includes Kovenda, Paalam and Perumpadappu Stand and the major roads are Pai Road, Kollassery Road and Konam Road.
 Fathima Hospital is a major hospital in the area.
 Santa Cruz Church is famous for the miracles of Infant Jesus. 
 Two Schools in Perumpadappu are St. Juliana's English Medium School and St. Antony's School in Koventa

Location

Cities and towns in Ernakulam district